Haler (formerly known as Haler-Uffelse) is a village in the Dutch province of Limburg. It is a part of the municipality of Leudal and lies about 9 km southeast of Weert.

The village was first mentioned in 1244 as Harle, and is a combination of "sandy ridge" and "open forest". Haler was home to 290 people in 1840. In 1952, a church was built.

References

Populated places in Limburg (Netherlands)
Leudal